The Parliament of Cambodia  is the bicameral legislature of the Cambodia consisting of the Senate and the National Assembly. The parliament is composed of 187 members, 125 MPs and 62 senators.

Parliament has two chambers.
The National Assembly has 125 members, elected for a five-year term by proportional representation.
The Senate has 62 members, two of which are appointed by the king and two others by the National Assembly, and the rest elected by the Commune Councillors and members of the National Assembly.

Composition

The National Assembly holds legislative power. In addition to the general law-making power, the National Assembly has specific powers regarding the national budget, taxes, administrative accounts, laws on general amnesty, international treaties and conventions, declarations of war, and the formation of the Royal Government.

Latest elections

National Assembly (2018)

Senate (2018)

The King and National Assembly each nominate two senators, bring the total to 61 members.

See also

Politics of Cambodia
List of legislatures by country

References

External links
National Assembly website
Senate website
National Election Committee
 List of Senators
 Ruling party wins Cambodia poll

 
Politics of Cambodia
Government of Cambodia
Cambodia
Cambodia
Cambodia